Midnight Sun is the second album by The Ghost of a Saber Tooth Tiger. The album was recorded on a farm belonging to Sean Lennon and Charlotte Kemp Muhl.

Track listing

Too Deep
Xanadu
Animals
Johannesburg
Midnight Sun
Last Call
Devil You Know
Golden Earring
Great Expectations
Poor Paul Getty
Don't Look Back Orpheus
Moth To A Flame

Reception
Will Hermes of Rolling Stone gave the album three and a half stars and said "This is a rock record, no apologies." Al Horner of NME gave it four stars  PopMatters described it as "practically dripping of the hippy, dippy late '60s" and called it "a near perfect album."

References

2014 albums
Sean Lennon albums